Caroline Leaf (born August 12, 1946) is a Canadian-American filmmaker, animator, director, tutor and artist. She has produced numerous short animated films and her work has been recognized worldwide. She is best known as one of the pioneering filmmakers at the National Film Board of Canada (NFB). She worked at the NFB from 1972 to 1991. During that time, she created the sand animation and paint-on-glass animation techniques. She also tried new hands-on techniques with 70mm IMAX film. Her work is often representational of Canadian culture and is narrative based. Leaf now lives in London UK and is a tutor at The National Film and Television School. She maintains a studio in London working in oils and on paper and does landscape drawing with iPad.

Biography and early work
Leaf was born in Seattle, Washington and lived in Boston. She attended Radcliffe College,  Harvard University, and majored in Architectural Sciences from 1964-1968. for visual arts from 1964-1968. During her last year of studies she enrolled in an animation class. The class was taught by  Derek Lamb as a creative practice not a professional training. Lamb encouraged his students to focus on movement.  Leaf worked with beach sand spread on a lightbox. This is when she created sand animation. Using this technique, she produced her first film Sand, or Peter and the Wolf and was awarded a scholarship from Harvard University. After graduation, she moved to Italy for a year to focus on her drawing. Returning to Harvard, she made her second animated film, Orfeo painting on glass (Paint-on-glass animation.) She then did freelance work from a studio in Boston and made How Beaver Stole Fire. Leaf moved to Montreal to work as an animator/director for the National Film Board of Canada in 1972. She worked at the NFB in the French and English animation departments until 1991. She made 9 animated and live puppet films and a documentary film in those years.

Career
Leaf made her first film, Sand, or Peter and the Wolf, in 1969 at Harvard University. The short was made by pouring sand on a light box and manipulating the shapes frame-by-frame. Her second film at Harvard, Orfeo, was painted on glass under the camera. In 1972 she was invited to join the  National Film Board of Canada's French Animation Studio. Her first film for the NFB was The Owl Who Married a Goose: An Eskimo Legend.

Making the film involved two trips to the Canadian arctic, first to collaborate on designs with the Inuit artist Nanogak and afterwards to record the sound effects for the film. Her most renowned short film was The Street, which was drawn directly under the camera with a mix of paint and glycerin. It was adapted from the short story by Mordechai Richler, and was nominated for the Academy Award for Best Animated Short Film at the 49th Academy Awards. It is also featured in the Animation Show of Shows.

Leaf co-directed an animated documentary film called Interview with Veronika Soul. She made a documentary film on the singers Kate and Anna McGarrigle, produced by Derek Lamb. In 1990, she made her first animation in nearly a decade by scratching into the emulsion of exposed black 70mm color film and reshooting it on 35mm film. She worked for 2 years using this technique on her film Two Sisters original version called Entre Deux Soeurs. The tone and story of this film is dark. Two Sisters won the award for best short film at the Annecy International Animated Film Festival in 1991.

Leaf worked as an animator/director at the NFB until 1991. In 1991 she left animation to establish herself as a fine arts artist working in oils. In 2004 she contributed animation to a film about the Underground Railroad produced by Acme Filmworks in Los Angeles called Suite for freedom. Her part was called Slavery.

Animation techniques and influence 
Leaf discovered a spontaneous and artistic hand crafted way of animatingin her animation class at Harvard and developed it in her professional career, pioneering: Sand animation, Paint on glass, and hand etching on film stock. All of her techniques have been described as having "fluid transitions". She used different techniques to best tell the story of each of her films which showcased her narrative-based style. She created simple anecdotal and fictional stories based on literary works. Her films contain characters with relatable and complex issues.  Her stories are mostly adaptations from literature and reflect her often dark narrative content. Every decision when I am animating is for the benefit of the story."

Leaf is also considered an influential Canadian filmmaker for her long standing service with the National Film Board of Canada and her representation of Canadian culture in her films. This can mainly be seen in her films The Street, The Owl who Married the Goose, and Kate and Anna McGarrigle.

Painting and drawing 
Since 2000 Leaf has maintained a studio in London, UK, and developed a personal style of painting in oils as well as drawings on paper. Her work is abstract and very much guided by mark making and a personal search to create spaces a viewer is invited to enter. She has also developed a lively landscape style of direct observation from nature and works on field trips with paper and pencil and also iPad using programs called Brushes and ProCreate.

Exhibitions 
www.onlinegallery.site ‘Two Artists One Drawing’ 2022

www.onlinegallery.site ‘Spaces’ 2021

Playing with Perception, The Gallery, St. Martin-in-the-Fields, Trafalgar

Square, London, 2015

The Leper Chapel, Cambridge, England, 2008

The Shop Gallery, Vallance Road, London, 2006

The Corridor Gallery, London, 2004

Krakow Animation Festival, Krakow, Poland, 1998

Zagreb International Animation Festival, Zagreb Croatia, 1996

Residencies 
Michael Nock Foundation, Hong Kong, 2014

Abbaye de Fontevraud, France, 2014

Banff Centre for Arts and Creativity, residency, summer 1997

Selected filmography

Awards

Other awards 
 1994: Norman McLaren Award
 1996: Life Achievement Award, World Festival of Animated Film - Animafest Zagreb
 2017: Winsor McCay Award (Life Achievement, Annie Awards)
 2019: Dragon of Dragons Award, Krakow Film Festival

Nominations 
 1977: Academy Award for The Street

References

External links
 Official website

 Watch several of her animated films at NFB.ca (free)
 Caroline Leaf -- femfilm.ca: Canadian Women Film Directors Database

1946 births
Living people
20th-century Canadian women artists
21st-century Canadian women artists
American animators
American expatriates in the United Kingdom
Canadian expatriates in England
Canadian women film directors
Canadian animated film directors
American women film directors
American animated film directors
National Film Board of Canada people
Directors of Genie and Canadian Screen Award winners for Best Animated Short
American women animators
Canadian women animators
Radcliffe College alumni
21st-century American women